The Mixed Team tournament in Judo at the 2014 Summer Youth Olympics was held on August 21 at the Longjiang Gymnasium.

Athletes of all weight classes were split into groups of 7 or 8 athletes in one of 13 teams.  The tournament bracket consisted of a single-elimination contest where the team with the most wins moves to the next round culminating in a gold match.  There were no repechages in this event, the two losing semi-finalists received bronze medals.

Team names
The teams are named after renowned judokas: 
 TEAM KANO - Jigorō Kanō - The founder of judo - First Asian Member of the IOC (1909-1938)
 TEAM GEESINK - Anton Geesink - Olympic Gold Champion Tokyo 1964 - Two-time World Champion, IOC member
 TEAM VAN DE WALLE - Robert Van de Walle - Olympic Gold Champion Moscow 1980 - Olympic Silver Medallist Seoul 1988
 TEAM DOUILLET - David Douillet - Olympic Gold Champion Atlanta 1996 / Sydney 2000 - Olympic Bronze Medallist Barcelona 1992 - Four-time World Champion
 TEAM BERGHMANS - Ingrid Berghmans - Olympic Gold Medallist Seoul 1988 - Six-time World Champion
 TEAM NEVZOROV - Vladimir Nevzorov - RUS - Olympic Gold Medallist Montreal 1976 - One-time World Champion
 TEAM TANI - Ryoko Tani - Olympic Gold Champion Sydney 2000 / Athens 2004 - Olympic Silver Medallist Barcelona 1992 / Atlanta 1996 - Olympic Bronze Medallist Beijing 2008 - Seven-times World Champion
 TEAM YAMASHITA - Yasuhiro Yamashita - Olympic Gold Champion Los Angeles 1984 - Four-time World Champion
 TEAM RUSKA - Willem Ruska - NED - Two-time Olympic Gold Champion Munich 1972
 TEAM XIAN - Dongmei Xian - Olympic Gold Champion Athens 2004 / Beijing 2008
 TEAM ROUGÉ - Jean-Luc Rougé - World Champion - Secretary General of IJF
 TEAM KERR - George Kerr - GBR - European Champion - Has 10th Dan IJF
 TEAM CHOCHISHVILI - Shota Chochishvili - Olympic Gold Medallist Munich 1972 - Olympic Bronze Medallist Montreal 1976

Team members

Results

References
 Official Judo Results Book

Judo at the 2014 Summer Youth Olympics
Youth Olympics, 2014